The  is a professional wrestling World tag team championship in Japanese promotion All Japan Pro Wrestling. It was created on June 10, 1988 as a unification of two previous tag team titles in All Japan; the PWF Tag Team Championship, and the NWA International Tag Team Championship; when the PWF champions Jumbo Tsuruta and Yoshiaki Yatsu defeated NWA champions The Road Warriors. As with the Triple Crown Heavyweight Championship, it is symbolized by four belts, two for each wrestler, representing the former PWF and NWA titles. It is currently the top of two tag team titles in AJPW, along with the secondary All Asia Tag Team Championship. There have been a total of 94 reigns shared between 62 different teams consisting of 66 distinctive champions. The current champions are Yuma Aoyagi and Naoya Nomura who are in their first reign as a team.

Title history

Combined reigns

By team

By wrestler

See also
Triple Crown Heavyweight Championship
World Junior Heavyweight Championship
All Asia Tag Team Championship
PWF Tag Team Championship
NWA International Tag Team Championship

References

External links
All-Japan.co.jp title history
Wrestling-Titles.com title history
TitleHistories.com title history

All Japan Pro Wrestling championships
Tag team wrestling championships